Ognyan (Bulgarian: Огнян) is a Bulgarian masculine given name that may refer to
Ognyan Gerdzhikov (born 1946), Bulgarian politician
Ognyan Nikolov (born 1949), Bulgarian sport wrestler
Ognyan Stefanov (born 1986), Bulgarian football player 
Ognyan Toshev (born 1940), Bulgarian cyclist 

Bulgarian masculine given names